Michel Camilo (born April 4, 1954) is a Grammy-award winning pianist and composer from Santo Domingo, Dominican Republic.  He specializes in jazz, Latin and classical piano work.  Camilo lists some of his main influences as Chick Corea, Keith Jarrett, Oscar Peterson, Bill Evans, and Art Tatum.

Background and career
Camilo was born into a musical family and as a young child showed aptitude for the accordion that his parents gave him.  Although he enjoyed the accordion, it was his grandparents' piano that sparked his interest the most, so at aged 9 he asked his parents to buy him one.  Their response was to first send him to the Elementary Music School, part of the National Conservatory, and then a year later to grant his wish.

The formal system of the music school taught Camilo to play in the classical style, and by age 16 he was playing with the National Symphony Orchestra of the Dominican Republic.  Camilo comments on his first encounter with the sounds of jazz, in an interview with the All About Jazz website:

"The first time I heard jazz was when I was 14 and a half. I heard the great Art Tatum on the radio playing his solo piano rendition of 'Tea for Two.' That immediately caught my ear. I just wanted to soak it in, to learn to play that style. Then I found out it was jazz."

Camilo studied for 13 years at the National Conservatory, and whilst developing his strong classical abilities was also heavily influenced by the bebop tradition, and by the contemporary jazz of Herbie Hancock, Keith Jarrett,  Chick Corea and Amilton Godoy (Zimbo Trio's pianist). His influences at this time also included Horace Silver, Erroll Garner, and the ragtime music of Scott Joplin.

When the Harvard University Jazz Band visited the Dominican Republic and heard Camilo at a jam session, the bandleader encouraged him, 'You should be in the States', and so the idea was planted.  In 1979, Camilo moved to New York to study at Mannes College and at The Juilliard School, and broke onto the international stage in 1983 when Tito Puente's pianist was unable to make a concert at the Montreal Jazz Festival.  On a recommendation, without hearing him, Puente asked Camilo to play.  Cuban reedman Paquito D'Rivera was in the audience and offered him a place in his band.  For four years, Camilo toured internationally with D'Rivera and recorded two albums with him.

Camilo's emergence as a star in his own right began around 1985, the year he debuted with his trio at Carnegie Hall.  In that same year he toured Europe with Paquito D’Rivera's quintet, and recorded his first album, Why Not?, for Japan's King label. His album Suntan/In Trio had a trio with Anthony Jackson on the bass and Dave Weckl on the drums. In 1988, Camilo debuted on a major record label, Sony, with the release of Michel Camilo, which became a bestseller and held the top jazz album spot for ten consecutive weeks. Special guests joined in with Camilo, such as percussionist Sammy Figueroa and tap dancer Raul. Other bestselling albums followed and so did the accolades, including a Grammy and an Emmy.  Camilo's collaborative 2000 album with flamenco guitarist Tomatito Spain won Best Latin Jazz Album in the first Latin Grammy Awards.

As well as being an outstanding performer, Camilo is a talented composer and has written scores for several Spanish language films including Los Peores Años de Nuestra Vida and the award-winning Amo Tu Cama Rica.

Camilo tours extensively, and lectures in Europe, the US, and in the Conservatory of Music of Puerto Rico.  He holds several honorary degrees, a Visiting Professorship and a Doctorate at Berklee College of Music, and has been honored in his home country by being named a Knight of the Heraldic Order of Christopher Columbus, and being awarded the Silver Cross of the Order of Duarte, Sanchez & Mella.

Association with other musicians

Camilo's regular trio lineup for many years had his long-term friends Anthony Jackson on contrabass guitar and Cliff Almond on drums.  Charles Flores has occupied the trio's bass seat since their Grammy-winning album Live at the Blue Note. Lately Camilo has drummer Dafnis Prieto as part of his trio. This new trio released the album Spirit of the Moment in April 2007.

Other musicians he has played with include Tito Puente, Paquito D'Rivera, Dizzy Gillespie, Katia Labèque, Toots Thielemans, Airto Moreira, Chuck Mangione, Stanley Turrentine, Claudio Roditi, Nancy Alvarez, Mongo Santamaría, George Benson, Eddie Palmieri, Jon Faddis, Gonzalo Rubalcaba, Lew Soloff, Tania Maria, Jaco Pastorius, Patato, Randy Brecker, Michael Brecker, Chuck Loeb, Giovanni Hidalgo, Guarionex Aquino, Wynton Marsalis, Dave Valentin, Flora Purim, Delfeayo Marsalis, Chucho Valdés, Joe Lovano, Herbie Hancock, Tomatito, John Patitucci, David Sanchez, Hiromi Uehara, Cachao, Marcus Roberts, Steve Gadd, Danilo Perez, Gary Burton, Billy Taylor, Dave Weckl, Hilton Ruiz, Roy Hargrove, Romero Lubambo, Niels-Henning Ørsted Pedersen, Leny Andrade, Bireli Lagrene, Marian McPartland,  Leonard Slatkin, Arturo Sandoval, Aisha Syed Castro, Béla Fleck, Lou Marini, Cliff Almond, Mark Walker.

Camilo is one of the ambassadors to Music Traveler GmbH, together with Billy Joel, Hans Zimmer, John Malkovich, Sean Lennon, Adrien Brody.

Discography

As leader/co-leader

As sideman

References

External links
Michel Camilo: Official Website

1954 births
Living people
People from Santo Domingo
Latin jazz pianists
Post-bop pianists
Berklee College of Music faculty
Dominican Republic composers
20th-century composers
21st-century composers
Dominican Republic pianists
Classical pianists
Dominican Republic songwriters
Male songwriters
Mannes School of Music alumni
Juilliard School alumni
Grammy Award winners
Latin Grammy Award winners
White Dominicans
21st-century classical pianists